The  16th Pan American Junior Championships were held in Miramar, Florida, United States, at the Ansin Sports Complex on July 22 to 24, 2011.   A detailed report on the
results was given.

Participation (unofficial)

Detailed result lists can be found on the "World Junior Athletics History"
website.  An unofficial count yields the number of about 341
athletes from about 36 countries:

Antigua and Barbuda (5), Argentina (11), Bahamas (23), Barbados (7), Bermuda
(7), Belize (1), Bolivia (1), Brazil (16), British Virgin Islands (5), Cayman
Islands (2), Canada (56), Chile (6), Colombia (12), Costa Rica (2), Dominica
(1), Dominican Republic (4), Ecuador (1), El Salvador (1), Grenada (1),
Guatemala (4), Guyana (2), Haiti (3), Jamaica (33), Mexico (15), Panama (1),
Peru (8), Puerto Rico (12), Saint Kitts and Nevis (1), Saint Vincent and the
Grenadines (2), Suriname (2), Trinidad and Tobago (12), Turks and Caicos (1),
United States (77), Uruguay (1), U.S. Virgin Islands (1), Venezuela (4).

Medal summary
Medal winners are published.
Complete results can be found on the Athletics Canada website, on the Half-Mile Timing website, on the USA Track & Field website, and on the World Junior Athletics History
website.

Men

Women

Medal table (unofficial)

References

External links
Official website
World Junior Athletics History

Pan American
Pan American
Pan American U20 Athletics Championships
International track and field competitions hosted by the United States
Miramar, Florida
Pan American Junior Athletics Championships
2011 in youth sport
Track and field in Florida